is a Shinto water ablution pavilion for a ceremonial purification rite known as temizu or .

This symbolic purification is normal before worship and all manned shrines have this facility, as well as many Buddhist temples and some new religious houses of worship. The temizu-ya ("temizu-area") is usually an open area where clear water fills one or various stone basins. In the 1990s, water for temizu at shrines was sometimes from domestic wells, and sometimes from the municipal supply.

Originally, this purification was done at a spring, stream or seashore and this is still considered the ideal. Worshippers at the Inner Shrine at Ise still use this traditional way of ablution.

See also
 Chōzubachi
 Glossary of Shinto
 Harae, a term for all Shinto purification rituals, including temizu
 Misogi, a Shinto ritual of full-body purification
 Ritual purification
 Tsukubai, a wash basin for visitors in Japanese Buddhist temples or roji
 Ablution in Christianity
 Wudhu

References

Further reading
, and links therein

Shinto architecture
Water and religion
Ritual purification
Shinto in Japan